Tuscany station is a CTrain light rail station in Tuscany and Rocky Ridge, Calgary, Alberta, Canada. It is the northern terminus of the Northwest Line (Route 201), and opened as part of the route's the 2 km (1.24 miles) extension on August 23, 2014. Originally referred to in planning documents as Tuscany/Rocky Ridge station, Calgary Transit simplified the name on the recommendation of the Community Consultation Committee.

The station, originally planned for completion after 2023, was approved and funded by Calgary City Council on November 7, 2007, for completion by 2011. The station had been included as part of Mayor Dave Bronconnier's re-election platform during the 2007 Municipal elections. Construction was to begin in the Spring of 2009 with completion in Fall 2011. However, budget issues as well as a delay with the Crowchild Trail/Stoney Trail Interchange delayed the start of construction three years to Spring 2012 with an opening date of August 23, 2014. It is currently the northwestern station/terminus on the CTrain system on the Red Line.

The station is located in the median of Crowchild Trail, to the west of Rocky Ridge Road. The station is the final station currently planned for the Northwest leg of the CTrain, and is located approximately 2 kilometers northwest of the previous last CTrain station; . After only a few weeks of service the station exceeded the estimated usage of 9,000 weekday customers with 11,000 recorded weekday customers in mid-September 2014.

The station has two Park and Ride lots, located on the north and south side of Crowchild Trail. Plans are to incorporate into the development an Art Moderne heritage gas station building and sign from a former restaurant and motel, Eamon's Bungalow Camp, that once lay along the Old Banff Coach Road.

On September 20, 2016, the worst accident in CTrain history occurred in the tail-tracks north of the station. In the early morning, a three car Series 8 train, composed of units (listed from the north-facing direction) 2311, 2310 and 2329, stopped at the platform, and then accelerated into the tail-track. The accident resulted in three injuries stemming from the 60 km/h impact with an overhead wire pole at the end of the tracks. The driver suffered serious injuries, as the catenary counterweights went through the windshield. The accident resulted in car 2311 being retired.

Buses

Route 157 has been extended to increase service coverage to the Royal Vista area of 100 Avenue N.W.  
Route 58 has been changed to Route 169.  
Routes 74, 158, 169 and 174 have been revised to service Tuscany Station and will no longer be going to Crowfoot Station.

References

CTrain stations
Railway stations in Canada opened in 2014
2014 establishments in Alberta